Parajotus cinereus is a jumping spider species in the genus Parajotus that lives in the Democratic Republic of the Congo and Uganda. The species was first identified by Wanda Wesołowska in 2004.

References

Salticidae
Spiders of Africa
Arthropods of the Democratic Republic of the Congo
Arthropods of Uganda
Spiders described in 2004
Taxa named by Wanda Wesołowska